Chaupimarca (hispanicized spelling from Quechua Chawpimarka, chawpi central, middle, marka village, "central village") is one of thirteen districts of the province Pasco in Peru.

References